Pitcairnia roseana is a plant species in the genus Pitcairnia. This species is endemic to Mexico.

References

roseana
Flora of Mexico